The Men's skeleton event in the IBSF World Championships 2016 was held on 18 and 19 February 2016.

Results
The first two runs were started on 18 February at 09:19 and the last two runs on 19 February at 15:34.

References

Men